Grosu or Grossu is a Romanian surname that may refer to:

 Alexandru A. Grosu, Moldovan football midfielder
 Alexandru Sergiu Grosu, Moldovan football striker
 Alina Grosu, Ukrainian child singer
 Aneta Grosu, Moldovan journalist
 Eduard Grosu, Moldovan footballer
 Gheorghe Grosu, Romanian politician, member of parliament (1990-1994)
 Gurie Grosu, Bessarabian priest and the first Metropolitan of Bessarabia
 Lora Grosu, Moldovan politician, member of parliament (2005–2009)
 Nicolae Grosu, Bessarabian politician, member of parliament (1917–1918)
 Maria Cristina Grosu-Mazilu, Romanian long-distance runner
Nicole Valéry Grossu, Romanian writer
Semion Grossu, Moldovan politician
Sergiu Grossu, Bessarabian-born Romanian writer and theologian

See also
 Groși (disambiguation)
 Groșii (disambiguation)
 Groșani (disambiguation)
 Groș (disambiguation)

Surnames
Romanian-language surnames